Kolari railway station is located in the municipality of Kolari in the Lapland region of Finland. It is the northernmost railway station in Finland, located 800 kilometers north of Helsinki Central railway station.

Kolari station is the terminus of the track from Tornio to Kolari, and serves both passenger and cargo traffic. Passenger traffic is at its highest during the skiing season and, as well as Kolari, the station also serves Levi, Ylläs, Äkäslompolo, Pallas and Muonio, all of which can be reached by bus from the station. For part of the year, the station is also served by car transporter trains from Helsinki, Turku and Tampere.

A new station building was constructed at Kolari in 2000, in the style of a Lappish hut. Most trains (both freight and passenger) at Kolari are hauled by VR Class Dr16 diesel locomotives, with smaller Dv12 locomotives also seeing use.

External links 

Railway station
Railway stations in Lapland (Finland)
Railway stations opened in 2000